The Globalization of World Politics: An Introduction to International Relations is an introduction to international relations (IR) and offers comprehensive coverage of key theories and global issues.Edited by John Baylis, Patricia Owens, and Steve Smith. It has eight editions, first published in 1997, in this book leading scholars in the field introduce readers to the history, theory, structures, and key issues in IR, providing students with an ideal introduction and a constant guide throughout their studies.

About the Author 
Patricia Owens is author and professor. She is a Tutorial Fellow at Somerville College, Oxford and a professor of International Relations at University of Oxford.

John Baylis is Emeritus Professor of Politics and International Relations and a former Pro Vice Chancellor at Swansea University.

Steve Smith  is the former Vice Chancellor of the University of Exeter and Professor of International Studies.

Table of contents

Part One: International Relations In A Global Era 
"Introduction" — John Baylis, Steve Smith and Patricia Owens

Part Two: The Historical Context

Part Three: Theories of World Politics

Part Four: Structures & Processes

Part Five: International Issues

Part Six: Globalization in The Future

References

1997 non-fiction books
Books about globalization
Political textbooks
International relations
Global politics
Oxford University Press books